Inates is a village and rural commune in the Tillabéri Region of Niger.

History

On 10 December 2019, one of the most deadly attacks in the history of Niger occurred. Islamic State attacked a military post with guns, bombs and mortars - killing 71 soldiers and kidnapping some others.

References

Communes of Niger
Tillabéri Region